Esteban Robles Espinosa (died 9 May 2008) was the commander of Mexico City's Investigative Police Force. He headed Mexico City's anti-kidnapping unit until 2003 and served on the internal affairs commission. He was fatally shot down on 9 May 2008 around dawn by armed men, a day after the death of Federal Police chief Édgar Eusebio Millán Gómez, probably in retaliation for the recent crackdown on organized crime.

References

Year of birth missing
2008 deaths
Deaths by firearm in Mexico
People murdered by Mexican drug cartels
Male murder victims
Mexican police officers
People murdered in Mexico